Extreme Fight Game RISE, known simply as RISE, is a Japanese kickboxing promotion company based in Tokyo, Japan. The name RISE is an abbreviation of "Real Impact Sports Entertainment". It produces events in Japan, which showcases ten male and three female weight classes. They also hold the KAMINARIMON events, which are exclusively open to amateur fighters.

Champions

History
RISE held their inaugural event, "R.I.S.E. I" on February 23, 2003, at the Gold Jim South Tokyo Annex in Ōmori, Japan. They held their first "Dead or Alive" tournament on December 23, 2003, which would later become an annual RISE event at the end of the year. Before the collapse of K-1 FEG, winners of the "Dead or Alive" tournaments earned a berth in the K-1 MAX Japan tournaments. After successfully holding "Dead or Alive" tournaments at 70kg for two consecutive years, by the end of 2005 they furthermore held tournaments at 60kg, 80kg and heavyweight as well.

It 2008, RISE opted to stop deciding on champions through one-day tournaments, as they believed the result of the matches may be affected by a combination of favorable match-ups and luck. They instead began deciding on champions through single five-round bouts. The first three championships were at 60kg, 70kg and at heavyweight. Rankings weren't established at the time.

Beginning with R.I.S.E. 46 ~ THE KING OF GLADIATORS '08 ~, RISE began to use Arabic numerals in event names. Up to that point, event names used Roman numerals.

The first women's championship was established on November 23, 2011, when Rena Kubota was crowned the RISE Queen after defeating Erika Kamimura.

On January 5, 2022, RISE announced a partnership with Glory, which would allow cross-promotion and mutual exchange of fighters under contract. On February 10, 2023, the reached the same agreement with K-1.

Rules
The original RISE rules allowed strikes with fists and elbows, but prohibited knee strikes. Passivity from fighters was penalized by half point deductions. From May 16, 2010, RISE adopted K-1 rules which allowed for a single knee strike, but prohibited elbow strikes. The bouts are contested across three rounds lasting three minutes. Two additional extra rounds can be fought. The fighters wear shorts or tight kick pants, while women must additionally wear a top. All fighters must have a mouth guard. Elbow strikes, excessive petroleum jelly usage, eye pokes, throws, and unsporting behavior may all results in a point deduction.

The KANARIMON events are contested across three rounds of two minutes. Alongside all the prohibitions present in RISE fights, knee strikes to the head are likewise prohibited. Single matches don't have an extension rounds in case of a draw, while tournament draws result in a single one minute extra round.

Broadcast
RISE events are broadcast by AbemaTV domestically in Japan. RISE World Series events are broadcast by FITE TV. Event replays are posted on YouTube.

Championship history

Heavyweight championship
Weight limit: 120 kg

Light Heavyweight championship
Weight limit: 90 kg

Middleweight championship
Weight limit: 70 kg

Welterweight championship
Weight limit: 67.5 kg

Super Lightweight World championship
Weight limit: 65 kg

Super Lightweight championship
Weight limit: 65 kg

Lightweight championship
Weight limit: 62.5 kg

Super Featherweight championship
Weight limit: 60 kg

Featherweight World championship
Weight limit: 57.5 kg

Featherweight championship
Weight limit: 57.5 kg

Bantamwweight World championship
Weight limit: 55 kg

Bantamweight championship
Weight limit: 55 kg

Super Flyweight championship
Weight limit: 53 kg

Flyweight championship
Weight limit: 51 kg

Queen championship
Weight limit: 48 kg

Women's Flyweight championship
Weight limit: 52 kg

Women's Mini Flyweight championship
Weight limit: 49 kg

Women's Atomweight championship
Weight limit: 47 kg

World Series champions

Dead or Alive Tournament champions

Mighty Eighty Tournament champions

Heavyweight Tournament champions

Queen of Queens Tournament champions

See also
 List of kickboxing organizations

References

Kickboxing organizations
Sports organizations established in 2003
2003 establishments in Japan
Kickboxing in Japan